Andrew French may refer to:

 Andrew French (politician) (1859–1936), member of the Minnesota House of Representatives
 Andrew French (sculptor) (fl. 1990s), English-born abstract sculptor